Goodenia quasilibera is a species of flowering plant in the family Goodeniaceae and is native to Western Australia and South Australia. It is an ascending to erect herb with lance-shaped leaves at the base of the plant, sometimes with toothed edges and racemes of yellow flowers with brownish lines.

Description
Flowering mainly occurs from August to January.

Taxonomy and naming
Goodenia quasilibera was first formally described in 1992 by Roger Charles Carolin in the Flora of Australia from a specimen collected by Alex George in the Thomas River valley in 1960. The specific epithet (quasilibera) means "almost free", referring to the sepals that are almost free from the ovary.

Distribution
This goodenia grows in sandy soil and clay on flats and occurs in disjunct populations between Meekatharra and Cape Arid in Western Australia and the Eyre Peninsula in South Australia.

Conservation status
Goodenia quasilibera is classified as "not threatened" by the Government of Western Australia Department of Parks and Wildlife.

References

quasilibera
Eudicots of Western Australia
Plants described in 1992
Taxa named by Roger Charles Carolin
Flora of South Australia